Tarzie Vittachi (September 23, 1921 – September 17, 1993), was a Sri Lankan journalist. He was born in Colombo, Ceylon. Vittachi authored two popular columns "Bouquets and Brickbats", and "Fly by Night" in the Ceylon Daily News. He later became the youngest editor (at 32) of the oldest newspaper in Asia, The Ceylon Observer, which was founded in 1834. He wrote a book known as Emergency 58 about the country's race riots in 1958 that won him the Magsaysay Prize in 1959. From 1957 he was chairman of the World Subud Association for 25 years. From 1960 to 1965 he was Asian director of the International Press Institute, an organization of editors devoted to promoting the freedom of the press. He was, at the same time, a correspondent for The Economist, the BBC and The Sunday Times of London and wrote a column for Newsweek. A book about the role of the Children's Fund in arranging truces to protect children in time of conflict, called "Between the Guns", was published posthumously.

Publications
Emergency '58: The story of the Ceylon race riots (1959) Andre Deutsch
The Brown Sahib (1962) Andre Deutsch
Trials of Transition in the Island of the Sun. A political satire (1962)
A Reporter of Subud (1963) Dharma book Co.
Times of Transition (1964)
The Fall of Sukarno (1967)
The Brown Sahib Revisited (1987) New Delhi: Penguin 
South America, Central America and the Caribbean. 2nd ed. (1987) Europa Publications International
*A Memoir of Subud (1988) Subud Publications International
Between the Guns: Children as a Zone of Peace (1993) Hodder & Stoughton 
Special Assignment: A Subud Trilogy (1996) Subud Publications Int. 
Subudo Reporteris (2005) Susila Budhi Dharma 
and
Fruitful Droppings: From the Legacy of Tarzie Vittachie by Matthew Barry Sullivan (1997)
Subud Publications International

References

External links
 The 1959 Ramon Magsaysay Award for Journalism, Literature and Creative Communication Arts 

Sri Lankan writers
Sri Lankan journalists
1921 births
1993 deaths
People from Colombo
Alumni of the University of Ceylon
Ramon Magsaysay Award winners
20th-century journalists